Sheikh Ibrahim al-Nama'a is an Iraqi imam in Mosul. He has been cited as an Islamist who preaches against the presence of American troops in Iraq.

References

Iraqi imams
Iraqi Islamists
People from Mosul
Living people
Year of birth missing (living people)